Jerolaman-Long House, also known as the Cass County Historical Society Museum, is a historic home located at Logansport, Cass County, Indiana. It was built about 1853, and is a two-story, three bay, Italianate style brick dwelling.  It has a two-story brick rear ell added about 1890. Both sections have low hipped roofs and sit on raised ashlar foundations.  The building has housed the Cass County Historical Society Museum since 1963.

It was listed on the National Register of Historic Places in 1985.

References

External links
Cass County Historical Society Museum website

History museums in Indiana
Houses on the National Register of Historic Places in Indiana
Italianate architecture in Indiana
Houses completed in 1853
Houses in Cass County, Indiana
National Register of Historic Places in Cass County, Indiana
Museums in Cass County, Indiana
Logansport, Indiana